Daegaksa is a Buddhist temple of the Jogye Order in Seoul, South Korea. It is located in Bongik 2-dong in the Jongno-gu area of the city.

See also
List of Buddhist temples in Seoul

References

External links
koreatemple.net

 

Buddhist temples in Seoul
Jongno District
Buddhist temples of the Jogye Order